Yelena Khloptseva (born 21 May 1960, in Minsk) is a rower from Belarus and Olympic champion. She won the gold medal in the double scull event with her partner Larisa Popova in the 1980 Moscow Olympic Games representing the Soviet Union. She also won a bronze medal in the quadruple scull event at 1992 Moscow Barcelona Olympic Games. She also won various medals at World Rowing Championships.

References

1960 births
Soviet female rowers
Belarusian female rowers
Living people
Sportspeople from Minsk
Rowers at the 1980 Summer Olympics
Rowers at the 1992 Summer Olympics
Medalists at the 1992 Summer Olympics
Medalists at the 1980 Summer Olympics
Olympic rowers of the Soviet Union
Olympic rowers of the Unified Team
Olympic gold medalists for the Soviet Union
Olympic bronze medalists for the Unified Team
Olympic medalists in rowing
World Rowing Championships medalists for the Soviet Union
Spartak athletes